The University of Neyshabur (or Nishapur) is a public university in Nishapur, Iran. Its main campus consists of three faculties located on the northwest of the residential area of the city. The University of Neyshabur also has an off-campus fine arts faculty. For ease of transportation, a campus bus line is in service between the campus and the site (campus) of the fine arts faculty. Up until its academic independence, the University of Neyshabur had been an affiliate of Ferdowsi University of Mashhad.

History
In 1992, Neyshabur (/neɪʃɑ:bu:r/) branch campus of Ferdowsi University of Mashhad (FUM) with two fields of Food Engineering and Social Sciences Research was established. Subsequently, in 1999, a FUM affiliate of Faculty of Arts began to operate. This faculty was officially authorized to admit students and confer degrees in Painting, Graphic Design and also Sculpture as a new addition in 2003.

In 2006, following the final agreement of Higher Education Office, Neyshabur Faculty of Arts was elevated to Neyshabur Higher Education Complex by adding the Faculty of Letters and Humanities and Faculty of Basic Sciences. Shortly, in 2009, Higher Education Office announced its approval on the definitive disjuncture of Neyshabur Higher Education Complex from FUM. In the following year, the foundation stone was laid through perseverance, organized planning and well-managed steps taken by the respective Chancellor of the Complex and his appointed administrators; accordingly, this task meaning the establishment of a public university, which had been the old dream of the people of this historic great city proved, and soon, it was legally and officially recognized as University of Neyshabur by the given approval to create two Faculties of Agriculture and Engineering. Then, the University of Neyshabur kept running with eight fields of study in bachelor's degree and three buildings.

Now, the University of Neyshabur is running educational and research activities with four active faculties including, Basic Sciences, Engineering, Humanities, and Arts in ten fields of study at undergraduate level including, Mathematics, Statistics, Physics, Electrical Engineering, Persian Language & Literature, English Language & Literature, Archeology, Sculpture, Painting, Graphic Design, and ten fields of study at graduate level including, Nuclear Physics, Solid Physics, Pure Mathematics, Archeology, Fundamental Particle Physics, Physical Chemistry, Mathematics, Archeology, Persian Language & Literature, Imagery and Art Research.

Faculties
The University of Neyshabur has four faculties:

Faculty of Fine Arts 
The first and the oldest faculty, which has been active, is the Faculty of Fine Arts. In 2003, this faculty kept going with the title of Neyshabur branch of Arts Faculty of FUM, and in 2009, after the definitive disjuncture from FUM it joined Neyshabur Higher Education Complex, and later the University of Neyshabur. Currently, this faculty admits students in three fields of study at undergraduate level including, Graphic design, Painting, Sculpture, and two fields of study at graduate level including, Imagery and Art Research with the help of 16 professional and experienced faculty members. At the present time, Art faculty contains more than 5000 square meters physical space including, educational environments, library, gallery, workshops, amphitheater, and cultural places. There are probably no other art and design colleges in eastern Iran with such well-equipped studios as University of Neyshabur which is guided by eminent instructors and researchers. The studios allow crafts to be created in different materials and allow students to use experimental and sometimes high-tech methods.

 Painting Department: This department admits full-time students for bachelor's program in painting with the presence of five faculty members. Master's program of this major is about to be established. 
 Graphic Design Department: This department admits undergraduate students in graphic design and graduate students in graphic design, imagery, and animation. The master's program of graphic design is about to be established.
 Sculpture Department: This department admits full-time students at undergraduate level in sculpture with different professions (abstract and figurative areas) with the presence of four faculty members.
 Art Research Department: In 2012, this department was established by admitting graduate students. Currently, it keeps going with the presence of five faculty members.

Faculty of Humanities 
This faculty started with the establishment of two fields of study including, English Language & Literature and Archeology. Now, it contains three majors for bachelor's program (Archeology, English and Persian Language & Literature) and two majors for master's program (Archeology and Persian Language & Literature), and fifteen faculty members. At the present time, the training classes of this faculty will be held in Pardis Campus of the university. Completing and using a 3500 square meters building, the classes will be transferred to another place, which will be a suitable place for the development of the faculty.

 Persian Language and Literature Department: This department admits students for both undergraduate and graduate program with the presence of five for full-time assistant professors (with the professions of mystical literature, rumor, and fiction).
 English Language and Literature Department: This department admits students for bachelor's program with the presence of six full-time faculty members (with teaching and literature expertise).
 Archeology Department: This department admits students for both undergraduate and graduate program with the presence of four full-time faculty members (with the professions of prehistoric, historic, and Islamic). According to the uniqueness of this field in northeast universities of the country, and also due to the history of Neyshabur, this major has the potential to develop both quantitatively and qualitatively.
 Facilities of the Faculty of Humanities: English laboratory provides students of this faculty with educational services through using sound system, visual system and satellite network. It also provides necessary facilities for holding audiovisual classes in different departments of this faculty.

Faculty of Basic Sciences 
In 2006, the faculty of basic sciences was established by admitting undergraduate students in Physics, which is the most populated faculty of the University of Neyshabur by the extension of the fields of study to three in bachelor's program and six in master's program, and 21 faculty members. This faculty will be transferred to a 4000 square meters building after its completion in a near future.

 Mathematics and Statistics Departments: These departments admit students at undergraduate level (mathematics & physics) and at graduate level (applied mathematics & pure mathematics) with the presence of nine full-time instructors and assistant professors.
 Physics and Chemistry Departments: These departments admit undergraduate students in physics and graduate students in subdisciplines of solid-state physics, nuclear physics, fundamental particle physics and physical chemistry with the presence of twelve full-time instructors and assistant professors.
 Facilities of the Faculty of Sciences: Laboratories: The collection of laboratories of the faculty is in operation in a more than 300 square meters space which has been equipped with advanced appliances. Therefore, students' projects and instructors' research studies can be conducted by means of these facilities. In addition, these laboratories can offer out-of-college research services.

Faculty of Engineering 
Faculty of engineering is the newest faculty of the University of Neyshabur which started by admitting students in electrical engineering (with four subdisciplines of telecommunications, power, electronic and control) in 2014. Currently, the department of electrical engineering has five experienced and professional faculty members, and unique laboratory and workshop services. In the near future, a 3600 square meters building will be available for the faculty. Given the existing capacities and capabilities, we hope that this faculty will grow rapidly and efficiently.

 Electrical Engineering Department: This department admits students for undergraduate program with four subdisciplines of telecommunication, power, electronic, and control by the presence of five full-time faculty members.
 Laboratory and workshop facilities of the engineering faculty: Faculty of engineering has a unique collection of laboratory and workshop facilities in a more than 300 square meters space. This collection has been equipped with the newest appliances and advanced industrial and practical facilities which aim to the integration of application-oriented education as well as the promotion of qualitative level of creativity and entrepreneurship in students. The collection of laboratory and workshop facilities of this faculty is ready to have cooperation with industrial companies and to provide out-of-college laboratory services; moreover, these facilities set up projects, students proposals, and instructors' research plans.

Research and facilities

 Institute of Neyshabur Studies: This institute is located in the Faculty of Arts which is established for the future of the University of Neyshabur as a point to express solidarity of diverse activities over history, culture, literature and to qualify these activities at a university level with scientific perspective. This institute will play an important and effective role in recognizing scientific, historical, and cultural city of Neyshabur.
 Institute for Astronomy & Cosmology, University of Neyshabur (IACUN): In order to commemorate, preserve, and propagate the manner of Khayyam, this great thinker, various activities have been done in Neyshabur City including different Astronomical Associations, Astronomical Complexes, and Planetarium of Khayyam, which is one of the largest scientific projects in Iran. This planetarium is the largest in the Middle East. This project has been entrusted to the Directorate of Culture and Islamic Guidance of Khorasan since 2000 and then to Ferdowsi University of Mashhad which has been achieved more than 80% of physical progress so far. However, with all the work done, one can easily feel the place of a coherent astronomical research center that is affiliated with a specialized field. For this reason, the University of Neyshabur, based on its indigenous capabilities and the use of experienced faculty members and experts in this field, has worked hard to establish a specialized astronomy center in order to disseminate the name of Iran and Iranian scholars such as Khayyam. Accordingly, the proposal is presented to establish a research center on astronomy at the University of Neyshabur.
 Library: The library of the university provides the required educational and research services for students and instructors in two separate spaces (Art Faculty and Pardis). The library includes a collection of 2000 books and a rich archive of national and international journals. Equipping the professional library of Hakim Omar Khayyam Neyshabur is one of the major plans of the library.
 Computer site: The computer site of the university provides the required educational and research services for students and instructors with a 350 square meters area in two separate places (Arts Faculty and Pardis) which contains more than 120 computers. Soon, the computer site will be equipped with a server of complex calculations by the development of the central laboratory of university.
 The Central Laboratory: In 2016, the central laboratory was established with the aim of centralized managing of the collection of laboratories and workshops of the faculties of basic sciences and engineering. One of the aims of the central laboratory is to provide out-of-college laboratory and workshop services to industrial companies, research organizations and researchers.

Notes

References

External links
 The University of Neyshabur official website

Buildings and structures in Nishapur
Ney
Education in Razavi Khorasan Province
Buildings and structures in Razavi Khorasan Province